VTO may refer to:

 Valero Texas Open, a professional golf tournament
 Verkehrs- und Tarifgemeinschaft Ostharz, a German transport company
 Vertical takeoff, a class of rocket or aircraft
 Vitou language (ISO 639:vto), a Papuan language of Indonesia
 Volume-time output, in Process chemistry
 Vserosiikoe Teatralnoe Obshchestvo ("All-Russian Theatrical Society"), the Soviet-era name of the Union of Theatre Workers of the Russian Federation